Kakaut (or Kakot) village is located in Kaithal Tehsil of Kaithal district in Haryana, India. As per 2009 stats, Kakaut village is also a gram panchayat.

Demographics
Most of the population of the village is हिन्दू GURJAR and widely spoken language is Haryanvi.

Schools
 Govt. Sr. Secondary Sechool.
 Saraswati Sr. Sec. School.
 Mout Litera Zee School.
 SAINIK SR. SECONDARY SCHOOL.
 SUN RISE PUBLIC SCHOOL.
 GREEN VALLEY PUBLIC SCHOOL

Transportation
The nearby Railway stations to Kakaut village are New Kaithal Halt Railway station (NKLE), Kaithal Railway station (KLE) and Geong Railway station (GXG).

From Kaithal bus stand, bus services are also available to Delhi, Hisar, Chandigarh, Jammu and many other places.

References 

Villages in Kaithal district